Nepalese scripts (Nepal Lipi: 𑐣𑐾𑐥𑐵𑐮 𑐁𑐏𑐮, Devanagari: नेपाल आखल) are alphabetic writing systems employed historically in Nepal Mandala by the indigenous Newars for primarily writing Nepal Bhasa. It is also used for transcribing Sanskrit and Pali. There are also some claims they have also been used to write the Parbatiya (Khas) language.

These scripts were in widespread use from the 10th to the early 20th-century, but have since been largely supplanted by the modern script known as Devanagari. Of the older scripts, about 50,000 manuscripts written in Nepal Lipi have been archived.

History

Pre development
Prior to development of Nepal Scripts, people in the Nepal Mandala used the following scripts which are shared within the South Asian region.
 Brāhmī script - Ashoka period
 Purva Licchavi Script - prior  Licchavi period
 Uttara Licchavi Script - later  Licchavi period (6th–11th or 12th century)

Early usage and development
The 'Nepal Script' or 'Nepalese script' appeared in the 10th century. The earliest instance is a manuscript entitled Lankavatara Sutra dated Nepal Era 28 (908 AD). Another early specimen is a palm-leaf manuscript of a Buddhist text the Prajnaparamita, dated Nepal Era 40 (920 AD). One of the oldest manuscript of Ramayana, preserved till date, was written in Nepal Script in 1041. 

The script has been used on stone and copper plate inscriptions, coins (Nepalese mohar), palm-leaf documents and Hindu and Buddhist manuscripts.

Among the famed historical texts written in Nepal Lipi are Gopalarajavamsavali, a history of Nepal, which appeared in 1389 AD, the Nepal-Tibet treaty of Nepal Era 895 (1775 AD) and a letter dated Nepal Era 535 (1415 AD) sent by Chinese Emperor Tai Ming to Shakti-simha-rama, a feudatory of Banepa.

Besides the Kathmandu Valley and the Himalayan region in Nepal, the Ranjana script is used for sacred purposes in Tibet, China, Japan, Korea, Mongolia, Bhutan, Sikkim and Ladakh.

The Jokhang Temple in Lhasa, Tibet is ornamented with mantras embossed in Ranjana script, and the panels under the eaves are numbered using Nepal Lipi.

Decline
In 1906, the Rana regime banned Nepal Bhasa, Nepal Era and Nepal Lipi from official use as part of its policy to subdue them, and the script fell into decline. Authors were also encouraged to switch to Devanagari to write Nepal Bhasa because of the availability of moveable type for printing, and Nepal Lipi was pushed further into the background. However, the script continued to be used for religious and ceremonial purposes till the 1950s.

Revival
After the Rana dynasty was overthrown and democracy established in 1951, restrictions on Nepal Bhasa were lifted. Attempts were made to study and revive the old scripts, and alphabet books were published. Hemraj Shakyavamsha published an alphabet book of 15 types of Nepalese alphabets including Ranjana, Bhujimol and Pachumol.

In 1952, a pressman Pushpa Ratna Sagar of Kathmandu had moveable type of Nepal script made in India. The metal type was used to print the dateline and the titles of the articles in Thaunkanhe monthly.

In 1989, the first book to be printed using a computer typeface of Nepal script, Prasiddha Bajracharyapinigu Sanchhipta Bibaran ("Profiles of Renowned Bajracharyas") by Badri Ratna Bajracharya, was published.

Types
The scripts known to have been used by the Newar people of pre-Gorkha Nepal (i.e., Nepala Mandala) or dynasties that ruled over them in history are as follows:

 Rañjana style
Rañjana script
 Flat-headed style
 Prachalit script
 Pāchūmol script
 Hiṁmol script
 Kuṁmol script
 Curve-headed style
 Bhujiṁmol script 
 Golmol script
 Kveṁmol script
 Litumol script

Among the different scripts based on Nepal script, Ranjana (meaning "delightful"), Bhujinmol ("fly-headed") and Prachalit ("ordinary") are the most common. Ranjana is the most ornate among the scripts. It is most commonly used to write Buddhist texts and inscribe mantras on prayer wheels, shrines, temples, and monasteries. The popular Buddhist mantra Om mani padme hum (meaning ("Hail to the jewel in the lotus" in Sanskrit) is often written in Ranjana.

Description

Consonants

The compound letters kṣa, tra and jña are often regarded as separate letters that are taught together with the other letters. Since the Newari language lacks retroflex consonants, the letters ṭa, ṭha, ḍa, ḍha, ṇa and ṣa are used only in loanwords. The same applies to the letter śa. Newari, on the other hand, has a number of sonorant consonants that are pronounced with creaky voice (ṅha, ñha, ṇha, nha, mha, rha and lha). They are written in compound letters consisting of "ha" combined with the letter for the corresponding modal sonorant.

Contextual forms

Some letters have alternative forms that are used when combined with certain vowel diacritics or included in a consonant cluster.

 Letter bha and ha changes appearance when combined with any of the vowel diacritics u, ū, ṛ, ṝ, ḷ and ḹ.
 Letter ja and ra forms ligatures together with the vowels u and ū.
 Vowels u changes appearance when combined with the letters ga, ta, bha and śa.

Compound letters

Consonant clusters are written by writing several consonant letters together in complex ligatures. How they are written depends on the shape of the letters and some letters have alternative shapes that are used depending on their position in the cluster.

Vowels

The vowel ṛ which in Sanskrit stands for syllable forming [ṛ] is used in Newar script to write the syllable ri.

In Newari, the vowels a and ā are pronounced with different vowel qualities. In order to write their long equivalents, some diacritics have been given partially different properties than what is otherwise usual in Brahmic scripts.

Vowel diacritics

Pracalit
Some of the vowel diacritics have different appearances depending on whether the consonant has a top line or not. There are seven consonants without top lines: ga, ña, ṭha, ṇa, tha, dha and śa.

Rañjanā
The vowel dialects can have up to three different appearances depending on which consonant they are combined with. The rules for ka are also used for ja, kṣa and jña. The rules for ga also apply to kha, ña, ṭha, ṇa, tha, dha and sha. The rules for ba are used for other letters.

Current use
Nepal Lipi is available in Unicode as Newa script. It is the official script used to write Nepal Bhasa. Ranjana script has been approved for encoding in 2021. 

The letter heads of Kathmandu Metropolitan City, Lalitpur Metropolitan City, Bhaktapur Municipality, Madhyapur Thimi Municipality ascribes its names in Ranjana Script.

In India, the official script for Newar language is Nepal Lipi.

Gallery

See also

Nepal Bhasa literature
Nepal Bhasa renaissance

External links
 Nepal Lipi Prakash
 Nepalese Alphabets - Nepal Lipi Samgraha
 Nepal Lipi Varnamala
 Sankshipta Nepal Lipi Parichaya
 Table of Evolution of Nepali Scripts
 Nepal Lipi Vikas
 Nepal Lipi Vigyan Samanya Parichaya
 Nepalma Prachalit Lipiko Parichaya

Notes

References 

Newar
Brahmic scripts
Writing systems of Newar language
Newar language